Soul To Soul (Music From The Original Soundtrack - Recorded Live In Ghana, West Africa) is the soundtrack to the concert film Soul to Soul released on Atlantic Records in 1971.

The concert was held for Ghana's 14th Independence Day on March 6, 1971 at the Black Star Square in Accra. It featured an array of performers including Ike & Tina Turner, Wilson Picket, Santana, Roberta Flack, and The Staple Singers. The concert was later released in theaters in August 1971, and select performances were compiled for the soundtrack album. The album peaked at number 10 on the Billboard Soul LP's chart in 1971.

Critical reception 
Billboard (September 18, 1971): Soul luminaries Roberta Flack, Eddie Harris & Les McCann, Wilson Pickett, Staple Singers, Ike & Tina Turner and the Voices of East Harlem jetted to Accra, Ghana last March 6 where 100,000 West Africans celebrated Ghana's 14th Independence Day with an all-night concert which became the basis for the hit film and now album. Ike & Tina Turner warm things up for Pickett's electrifying "Funky Broadway."

Track listing

Chart performance

References 

African-American music in Africa
Soul soundtracks
Soul compilation albums
Atlantic Records albums
1971 albums